Max Patkin (January 10, 1920 – October 30, 1999) was an American baseball player and clown, best known as the Clown Prince of Baseball (a play on "Crown Prince").

Patkin was the third "officially" crowned Clown Prince of Baseball, after Al Schacht and Jackie Price, though that nickname has also been applied to St. Louis Browns third baseman Arlie Latham among others. Patkin performed for 51 years as a baseball clown.

Career
After an arm injury curtailed his minor league career, Patkin joined the Navy during World War II.

In mock anger, Patkin threw his glove down then followed DiMaggio around the bases, much to the delight of the fans—and a career was born.

Later in the 1940s, Patkin was hired as a coach by Bill Veeck and the Cleveland Indians.

As a barnstormer, Patkin played minor league stadiums throughout the United States and Canada. He had a face seemingly made of rubber which he could contort into various shapes. Patkin was rail thin and wore a baggy uniform with a question mark (?) on the back in place of a number, and a ballcap that was always askew. While some derided his act as corny, he became a beloved figure in baseball circles.

The Clown Prince received a promotion in 1988, when Patkin was named King of Baseball at that year's Winter Meetings in Atlanta, and can be seen appearing (as himself) alongside Kevin Costner and Tim Robbins in the popular baseball movie Bull Durham made the same year.

Patkin estimated he made more than 4,000 appearances. On July 20, he played to a crowd of four in Great Falls, Montana as most fans were home watching Neil Armstrong and Buzz Aldrin land on the moon.

In May 2020  Patkin was voted into the Shrine of the Eternals by the Baseball Reliquary, a fan driven collective dedicated to fostering an appreciation of baseball culture in all of its forms.

Death
He died in 1999, at age 79, in Paoli, Pennsylvania of an aneurysm.

In popular culture
In 1988, Patkin was featured as his real life character in the romantic comedy sports film, Bull Durham.

Chuck Brodsky, the folksinger and baseball balladeer, has written a song, "Gone to Heaven", about Max. It appeared on his 2000 release, Last of the Old Time, and was later collected on his 2002 album, The Baseball Ballads.

The bluesman Watermelon Slim (William P. Homans) wrote and released the song "Max, The Baseball Clown" on his 2008 CD, No Paid Holidays (NorthernBlues Music Inc, Ottawa ON). Homans, who grew up in the minor-league town of Asheville, NC, watched Max Patkin do two shows in successive years in the early 1960s, and wrote a reminiscence of him more than 40 years later.

References

External links

Retrosheet
Baseball Biography Project – profile of Arlie Latham
Charleston Riverdogs Press Release – Myron Noodleman to be Named Baseball Clown Prince
Greater Tulsa Reporter – Myron Noodleman Becomes Clown Prince of Baseball

1920 births
1999 deaths
American clowns
Jewish American military personnel
United States Navy personnel of World War II
Baseball players from Pennsylvania
Jewish American baseball players
People from Paoli, Pennsylvania
United States Navy sailors
Wisconsin Rapids White Sox players
Green Bay Bluejays players
Wilkes-Barre Barons players
20th-century American Jews